Half Moon Lake is a hamlet in Alberta, Canada within Strathcona County. It is also recognized as a designated place by Statistics Canada under the name of Half Moon Estates.

The hamlet was founded in the late 1950s when the land north of the lake was subdivided into residential lots, with the subdivision of the south side following soon after.

Demographics 
The population of Half Moon Lake according to the 2022 municipal census conducted by Strathcona County is 187, a decrease from its 2018 municipal census population count of 214.

Lake 

Although the lake is surrounded by private land, visitors to Strathcona County will find the commercially run Half Moon Lake Resort at the south end of the lake, which provides access to the lake. The resort, open during the summer months, has campsites, a developed beach, and boat launch.

See also 
List of communities in Alberta
List of designated places in Alberta
List of hamlets in Alberta

References 

Hamlets in Alberta
Strathcona County
Designated places in Alberta